Uma are traditional vernacular houses found on the western part of the island of Siberut in Indonesia. The island is part of the Mentawai islands off the west coast of Sumatra.

The structures are influenced by the Acehnese style, they are built on a much larger scale. They were formerly used as uma longhouses by the Sakuddei tribe before they were forced to abandon their traditional way of life through government intervention in the 1950s and 1960s. Since then, some attempts have been made to re-establish them in their former areas of settlement. Uma longhouses are rectangular with a verandah at each end. They can be 300 m2 in area. Built on piles, they traditional have no windows. The insides are separated into different dwelling spaces by partition which usually have inter-connecting doors. 

Villages are built alongside river banks and are made up of one or more communal Uma longhouses and single-storey family houses known as lalep. Villages housed up to 300 people and the larger villages were divided into sections along patrilineal clans of families with their own uma. Rusuk were dwellings for widows and bachelors which are similar to the family longhouse but without an altar. The uma is the centre of social, religious, and political life and it is here where every village member of egalitarian Mentawai society is able to contribute meetings about matters affecting the community. Like many Indonesians, Mentawaians believe in a separable soul that leaves the body upon death becoming a ghost. To protect themselves from these spirits, fetish sticks are placed by the entrances of the log wall that surrounds and fortifies the village and forms a stockade for cattle.

See also

 Architecture of Sumatra
 Mentawai

References
 

Rumah adat